Dinochares is a genus of moths in the family Lecithoceridae.

Species
Dinochares conotoma (Meyrick, 1908)
Dinochares notolepis Park, 1999

References

Lecithocerinae
Taxa named by Edward Meyrick
Moth genera